The Four Pitchikers is a Barbershop quartet from Missouri that won the 1959 SPEBSQSA international competition in Chicago.

Discography 
 Let's Bust One! (1963; LP; with Ken Keltner singing tenor)

References 

Barbershop quartets
Barbershop Harmony Society